Bandai Namco Holdings is a Japanese holdings company that specializes in video games, toys, arcades, anime and amusement parks, and is headquartered in Minato-ku, Tokyo. They were formed after the merge of Namco and Bandai on 29 September 2005, with both companies' assets being merged into a single corporate entity. The video game branch of the company is Bandai Namco Entertainment, producing games for home consoles, arcade hardware and mobile phones. Bandai Namco creates several highly successful video game franchises, including Tekken, Pac-Man, Gundam and Tales, as is Japan's third largest video game company and the seventh in the world by revenue, as well as the largest toy company in the world by 2017.

Since 1990, Bandai Namco has produced compilations containing their games, notably their arcade titles from the 1970s and 1980s, for various home video game systems, handhelds, personal computers and arcade boards. Out of these compilations, the Namco Museum series has been the most successful, selling a total of 9.113 million copies total across all platforms. Some of these compilations would be outsourced to other game developers, including Microsoft, Mass Media, Digital Eclipse, M2, and Cattle Call.

List of compilations

See also
List of Namco games
List of Bandai Namco video games

Footnotes

References

Namco games
Technology-related lists